Latin Mass may refer to:

 Liturgical use of Latin
 Mass of Paul VI in Latin
 Tridentine Mass
 As part of the use of preconciliar rites after the Second Vatican Council
 Some liturgies of the Pre-Tridentine Mass

See also
 Latin Mass Magazine
 Latin Mass Society (disambiguation)
 Latin Church
 Latin liturgical rites
 Traditionalist Catholicism